Robert "Bud" Templeton Hamilton (11 November 1903 – 7 February 1964) was an Irish professional footballer.

Hamilton started his career with his hometown club, Newry Town. He then moved to Scotland with Rangers, where he was a member of their 1929–30 'clean-sweep' team which claimed the Scottish Football League championship, Scottish Cup, Glasgow Cup and Charity Cup. He had already won the double in 1927–28 and the league title in 1928–29 (losing in the 1929 Scottish Cup Final), and claimed one further championship medal in 1930–31.

He left Ibrox in February 1933 to sign for English Division Two side, Bradford City. In two seasons at Valley Parade he made 26 appearances before moving north of the border again to join Third Lanark (taking part in the 1936 Scottish Cup Final, a defeat to former employers Rangers), and later moved to Morton before returning to Northern Ireland with Bangor.

Whilst with Rangers, Hamilton added five Ireland caps to the Inter-League honour he had won while with Newry Town just before moving to Glasgow. He tasted victory just once, on his debut against Scotland in February 1928.

References

1903 births
1964 deaths
Sportspeople from Newry
Association footballers from Northern Ireland
Newry City F.C. players
Bangor F.C. players
Rangers F.C. players
Bradford City A.F.C. players
Third Lanark A.C. players
NIFL Premiership players
Scottish Football League players
English Football League players
Irish League representative players
Greenock Morton F.C. players
Pre-1950 IFA international footballers
Association football defenders